Wingles is a commune of the Pas-de-Calais department in the Hauts-de-France region of France.

Geography

Population

Places of interest
 The church of St. Leger, rebuilt along with the rest of the town, after World War I.

Notable people
 Émilienne Moreau-Evrard, French resistance heroine, was born at Wingles in 1898.

See also
Communes of the Pas-de-Calais department

References

External links

 Official town website 
 Website of the intercommunality 

Communes of Pas-de-Calais
Artois